Listrura is a genus of pencil catfishes native to South America.

Taxonomy
Listrura was first described in 1988 for two species from southeastern Brazil, the first record of the subfamily Glanapteryginae outside of the Amazon River basin. It was described for the species L. nematopteryx and L. camposi; L. camposi had been assigned to the genus Eremophilus, while L. nematopteryx had been misidentified as another species of Eremophilus. L. tetraradiata was described in 2002 from the Rio de Janeiro State in Brazil. L. boticario was described later in 2002 from southern Brazil. L. picinguabae was described in 2006. This genus is currently monophyletic.

With the description of L. tetraradiata in 2003, it was hypothesized that L. tetraradiata possibly constitutes the sister group to a clade comprising the only other two previously described species of Listrura, L. camposi and L. nematopteryx. As of 2006, two species of Listrura, L. camposi and L. boticario, were known only from their holotypes. The lack of osteological information for these species impedes a complete analysis of phylogenetic relationships within the genus. It was hypothesized that L. nematopteryx and L. picinguabae comprise a monophyletic assemblage, given the fact that the pectoral fin of these species consists of a single ray and the ray is in the form of a long filament, a condition not present in any other trichomycterids thus far described.

Listura is the most basal member of the subfamily Glanapteryginae; it is sister to a clade formed by the other three genera, Glanapteryx, Pygidianops, and Typhlobelus.

Species
There are currently nine recognized species in this genus: 
 Listrura boticario de Pinna & Wosiacki, 2002
 Listrura camposi Miranda-Ribeiro, 1957
 Listrura costai Villa-Verde, Lazzarotto & Lima, 2012 
 Listrura depinnai Villa-Verde, Ferrer & L. R. Malabarba, 2014 
 Listrura macacuensis Costa & Katz, 2021
 Listrura macaensis Costa & Katz, 2021
 Listrura nematopteryx de Pinna, 1988
 Listrura picinguabae Villa-Verde & W. J. E. M. Costa, 2006
 Listrura tetraradiata Landim & W. J. E. M. Costa, 2002

Distribution
Listrura is endemic to small coastal river basins of southeastern Brazil. L. boticario originates from Da Figueira and Guaraqueçaba River basins, Paraná State. L. camposi inhabits the Poço Grande River, a tributary of the Juquiá River in the São Paulo State, and Ribeirão da Ilha of Florianópolis in Santa Catarina State. L. nematopteryx is distributed in the Imbariê Creek and basin of the Estrela River system of Piabetá in the Rio de Janeiro State, and Picinguaba in the São Paulo State. L. picinguabae is only known from small tributaries to the da Fazenda River in the São Paulo State. L. tetraradiata is from the Ibicuíba River of the Araruama Lagoon system.

Description
The body is elongate and may be cylindrical. These fish have three pairs of barbels. The mouth is subterminal. These fish are lacking in pelvic fins. The caudal fin is rounded. The caudal skeleton is compact and fused. Listura species grow to about 3.7–4.9 centimetres (1.5–1.9 in) SL.

Ecology
Listrura occur in shallow-water leaf-litter deposits underlain by mud or deeper layers of leaf litter. Listrura inhabits extremely small, shallow, and temporary water bodies, marginal to main water courses covered with vegetation; no species of Listrura is known to occur in creeks or rivers, except apparently as stray or colonizing specimens. L. picinguabae inhabits narrow and shallow (about 20 cm or 12 in deep) streams in dense tropical forest; it is encountered buried in the litter bottom. L. tetraradiata has been found in small, clear water forest streams; these habitats are shallow (about 40 cm or 16 in deep), with large rocks on the banks and gravel and sand on the bottom. L. tetraradiata has been found to have copepods, insect larvae, and mites in their stomach contents.

References

Trichomycteridae
Fish of South America
Fauna of Brazil
Freshwater fish genera
Catfish genera